Çaldıran may refers to;
 Çaldıran district of Van Province, Turkey.
 Battle of Çaldıran